"I Am in Love" is a 1953 popular song written by Cole Porter, for his musical Can-Can, where it was introduced by Peter Cookson.

Notable recordings
Nat King Cole - His 1953 single release reached No. 19 in the Billboard chart. Cole re-recorded the song in stereo and it was included on his album The Nat King Cole Story (1961).
Vic Damone - On the Street Where You Live (1964).
Eddie Fisher - As Long as There's Music (1958).
Ella Fitzgerald - Ella Fitzgerald Sings the Cole Porter Songbook (1956)
Peggy Lee - Latin ala Lee! (1960)
Shelly Manne and His Men - At the Black Hawk 3 (1959)
Les McCann - recorded a version for his live 1966 album Spanish Onions.
Johnny Mathis - The Rhythms and Ballads of Broadway (1960)

References

Songs written by Cole Porter
Ella Fitzgerald songs
Nat King Cole songs
Songs from Can-Can (musical)
1953 songs